General John Lambton (26 July 1710 – 22 March 1794) of Harraton Hall, later of Lambton Castle, County Durham, was a senior officer in the British Army and a Member of Parliament.

Life
Lambton was the fourth son of Ralph Lambton (c. 1651–1717) and educated at Westminster School.

He was commissioned as an ensign in the Coldstream Guards in 1732, then promoted to lieutenant in 1739, captain and lieutenant-colonel in 1746 and colonel of the 68th Foot in 1758, a position he held until his death. He was made a full general on 20 November 1782.

He was Member of Parliament for Durham City from 1762 to 1787.

He died on 22 March 1794.

Family
He married Lady Susan Lyon (died 1769), daughter of Thomas Lyon, 8th Earl of Strathmore and Kinghorne, in 1763. Their children included:
 William Henry Lambton of Lambton (1764–1797), who succeeded him as MP for Durham City and father of the First Earl of Durham
 Susan Mary Anne Lambton, who married John Wharton, MP
 Ralph John Lambton (c. 1767–1844), also MP for Durham City
 Jane Dorothy Lambton

Notes

References

External links
 
 Lambton genealogy

1710 births
1794 deaths
British Army major generals
Coldstream Guards officers
68th Regiment of Foot officers
Members of the Parliament of Great Britain for City of Durham
British MPs 1761–1768
British MPs 1768–1774
British MPs 1774–1780
British MPs 1780–1784
British MPs 1784–1790
John